Killadi Mappillai is a 1994 Indian Tamil language comedy film, directed by J. George Prasad. The film stars Pandiarajan, Sindhuja and Divyasri, with Vennira Aadai Moorthy, C. R. Saraswathi, S. S. Chandran, Vadivelu, Jayalalita and Chinni Jayanth playing supporting roles. It was released on 26 August 1994. This film is a remake of the Telugu film Jayammu Nischayammu Raa (1989). The film became a failure at the box office.

Plot

Rajaram (Pandiarajan) and his friend Dhanapal (Chinni Jayanth) are college students and they live together. Rajaram's father (Mohan Gandhiraman) decides to arrange the wedding between Rajaram and his relative Sarasu (Divyasri), who is very outspoken. Rajaram is at first reluctant about this marriage, but he accepts because of his father's insistence. Sarasu really loves Rajaram. In the meantime, Rajaram falls in love with the college girl Shanthi (Sindhuja). When Rajaram proposes his love for Shanthi, she rejects it. Shanthi, even so, advises him to convince her parents. What transpires later forms the crux of the story.

Cast

Pandiarajan as Rajaram
Sindhuja as Shanthi
Divyasri as Sarasu
Vennira Aadai Moorthy as Jagannadhan, Shanthi's father
C. R. Saraswathi as Meenakshi, Shanthi's mother
S. S. Chandran
Vadivelu
Jayalalita as Gangamma
Chinni Jayanth as Dhanapal
Meesai Murugesan as Periyasamy
Vinodh as Prathap
Mohan Gandhiraman as Rajaram's father
Srilekha
Lakshmi Priya
Bindu Madhavi
Loose Mohan as Swamy
Thideer Kannaiah
Vellai Subbaiah
R. Sarathkumar as himself (cameo appearance)

Soundtrack

The film score and the soundtrack were composed by the film director Deva. The soundtrack, released in 1994, features 5 tracks with lyrics written by Vaali.

Reception
New Sunday Times wrote that film suffered from lack of good plot and a good director.

References

1994 films
1990s Tamil-language films
Films scored by Deva (composer)
Indian comedy films
Tamil remakes of Telugu films